Happiness Ahead is a lost 1928 silent film drama directed by William A. Seiter and starring Colleen Moore and then husband and wife Edmund Lowe and Lilyan Tashman. It was produced by First National before it acquired by Warner Brothers. Moore was married to the producer John McCormick who frequently produced her films and they held rights to their films. Moore donated copies of her films to the Museum of Modern Art (MOMA) and over the years the archive allowed the films to decay including Happiness Ahead.

This film is now lost save for footage from its trailer. The trailer was preserved by the Academy Film Archive in 2009.

Cast
Colleen Moore as Mary Randall
Edmund Lowe as Babe Stewart
Charles Sellon as Mr. Randall
Edythe Chapman as Mrs. Randall
Carlos Durand as Vargas
Lilyan Tashman as Kay
Robert Elliott as The Detective
Diane Ellis as Edna

References

External links

1928 films
American silent feature films
Films directed by William A. Seiter
Lost American films
First National Pictures films
1928 drama films
American black-and-white films
Silent American drama films
1928 lost films
Lost drama films
1920s American films